The Men's Freestyle competitions at the 2022 European Juniors Wrestling Championships were held in Rome, Italy between 27 June to 3 July 2022.

Men's freestyle 57 kg 
 Legend
 F — Won by fall

Men's freestyle 61 kg 
 Legend
 F — Won by fall

Top half

Bottom half

Men's freestyle 65 kg 
 Legend
 F — Won by fall

Men's freestyle 70 kg 
 Legend
 F — Won by fall
 DSQ — Disqualified

Top half

Bottom half

Men's freestyle 74 kg 
 Legend
 F — Won by fall

Top half

Bottom half

Men's freestyle 79 kg 
 Legend
 F — Won by fall

Top half

Bottom half

Men's freestyle 86 kg 
 Legend
 F — Won by fall

Men's freestyle 92 kg 
 Legend
 F — Won by fall

Top half

Bottom half

Men's freestyle 97 kg 
 Legend
 F — Won by fall

Men's freestyle 125 kg 
 Legend
 F — Won by fall

References 

Men's Freestyle